Jagannath Singh (March 7, 1946 in Chitarangi, Sidhi district–August 3, 2015 in Bhopal, Madhya Pradesh) was a member of the 9th Lok Sabha and 12th Lok Sabha of India. He represented the Sidhi constituency of Madhya Pradesh. He was a member of the Bharatiya Janata Party political party.

He served as an MLA four times, twice as a Lok Sabha member from Sidhi constituency and once as a Rajya Sabha member from Madhya Pradesh. He was a member of the Madhya Pradesh Legislative Assembly from the Devsar constituency in 1977. He was the labour minister during 2008 to 2013.

References

India MPs 1989–1991
India MPs 1998–1999
1946 births
2015 deaths
Bharatiya Janata Party politicians from Madhya Pradesh
Lok Sabha members from Madhya Pradesh
People from Sidhi district
Rajya Sabha members from Madhya Pradesh
Madhya Pradesh MLAs 1977–1980
Madhya Pradesh MLAs 1985–1990
Madhya Pradesh MLAs 1998–2003
Madhya Pradesh MLAs 2003–2008